Skillion or Skillions may refer to:

Skillion roof, a type of roof
A lean-to or shed with a skillion roof
Skillion, a name for an indefinite or fictitious number
Skillions Records, a record label founded by Jayso
The Skillion, a promontory in Terrigal, New South Wales